Dimitri De Fauw (13 July 1981 – 6 November 2009) was a Belgian professional road and track bicycle racer. He was born in Ghent. De Fauw competed on both the road and track but is best known for his crash during the 2006 Six Days of Ghent.

On 26 November, De Fauw collided with Spanish cyclist Isaac Gálvez during the madison portion of the Six Days of Ghent cycling event in Belgium. Both riders fell, though Gálvez crashed into the track's upper railing and was knocked unconscious. While medics resuscitated him at the scene, the Spaniard died of his injuries en route to hospital.

Despite continuing to race as a professional, De Fauw suffered from ongoing depression in the aftermath of Gálvez's death and was haunted by the accident. In an interview the following month, the 25-year-old De Fauw said, "I will carry this with me for the rest of my life. Only time can heal my wounds."

De Fauw committed suicide on 6 November 2009 in Belgium, shortly after competing in the Six Days of Grenoble.

References

External links 
 

1981 births
2009 deaths
Belgian male cyclists
Suicides in Belgium
Sportspeople from Ghent
Cyclists from East Flanders
2009 suicides